Vice Admiral Edward Lull "Ned" Cochrane (March 18, 1892 – November 14, 1959) was a United States Navy officer and naval architect who served as Chief of the Bureau of Ships during World War II. In this capacity, he was directly responsible for the Navy's massive shipbuilding and maintenance program from November 1942 until November 1946.

Naval career

The son of retired Marine Brigadier General Henry Clay Cochrane (1842–1913), Edward Lull Cochrane was born at Mare Island, California in 1892.  He entered the United States Naval Academy in 1910 and was commissioned as a Navy ensign upon graduation in 1914. During World War I, he served at Philadelphia Naval Shipyard and transferred to the Navy's Construction Corps. He graduated in 1920 from the Massachusetts Institute of Technology (MIT), with a Master of Science degree in Naval Architecture.

Between the World Wars, Cochrane served in various positions related to shipbuilding, including in the Navy's Bureau of Construction and Repair, predecessor to the Bureau of Ships.

He assumed the post of Chief, BuShips in November 1942, succeeding Rear Admiral Alexander H. Van Keuren.  From January 1941 until assuming command of the bureau, Cochrane served as the Assistant Head of the Design Division.

Academic career
Cochrane retired from the navy in 1947, while serving as a member of the President's Advisory Committee on the Merchant Marine.  He then joined the faculty of MIT, serving from 1947 to 1950 as head of the Department of Ocean Engineering (originally known as the Department of Naval Architecture), and from 1952 to 1954 as head of the School of Engineering.

Last years and legacy
Vice Admiral Cochrane died in New Haven, Connecticut, on November 14, 1959, at the age of 67.

Many of Vice Admiral Cochrane's papers are held at the Naval Historical Center at the Washington Navy Yard in Washington, D.C. The papers include documents pertaining to the reorganization of the Bureau of Ships during World War II as well as transcripts of official speeches given by Admiral Cochrane during his term as head of that Bureau. Additionally, there are many personal papers and photographs relating to the Admiral's close association with civilian Naval Architecture and engineering organizations.

A small amount of related papers, focusing on his student years at MIT, are also available at the MIT Institute Archives and Special Collections.

Awards and honors
Cochrane received many awards and honors for his contributions to naval architecture, including the David W. Taylor Medal, and more generally to the field of engineering. He was a member of the National Academy of Sciences, and in 1953 received honorary membership in the American Society of Mechanical Engineers (ASME).

Cochrane was also awarded the Distinguished Service Medal, and was an honorary Knight Commander of the Order of the British Empire.

MIT's Admiral Edward L. Cochrane Award is presented each year to an outstanding student athlete. The award goes to a male senior for demonstrating humility, leadership and inspiration in intercollegiate sports.

The , a Charles F. Adams-class guided missile armed destroyer, was named in his honor.

Admiral Cochrane Drive in Annapolis was named in his honor.

References

External links

Spanish–American War Centennial Website : A Brief Biography of Major Henry Clay Cochrane, U.S.M.C., Assistant Executive Officer, First Marine Battalion.
National Academy of Sciences :  Biographical Memoir of Edward L. Cochrane
National Academy of Sciences Biographical Memoir
Papers of Edward L. Cochrane, Operational Archives Branch, Naval Historical Center, Washington, D.C.

1892 births
1959 deaths
United States Navy vice admirals
United States Navy personnel of World War I
United States Navy World War II admirals
American naval architects
Members of the United States National Academy of Sciences
Recipients of the Navy Distinguished Service Medal
Honorary Knights Commander of the Order of the British Empire
Military personnel from Vallejo, California
United States Department of Transportation officials
Truman administration personnel